Bernard d'Armagnac, Count of Pardiac (died 1462) was a younger son of Bernard VII, Count of Armagnac and Bonne of Berry.

Bernard fought at the Battle of Patay in 1429. That year he married Eleanor of Bourbon-La Marche, daughter and ultimately heir of James II, Count of La Marche. Count James was the consort of Queen Joanna II of Naples. Bernard served as lieutenant-general in La Marche and governor of Limousin in 1441, and later as lieutenant-general of Languedoc and Roussillon in 1461.

Bernard was the father of:

 Jacques d'Armagnac, Duke of Nemours 
 John d'Armagnac (1440-1493)

References

Sources

Year of birth unknown
1462 deaths
15th-century peers of France
Armagnac, Bernard of
Armagnac, Bernard of
Armagnac, Bernard of